Jessica Zi Jia Guo (born 23 June 2005) is a Canadian left-handed foil fencer.

Career

In 2019, Guo won the silver medal in the women's foil event at the Pan American Games held in Lima, Peru. In the final, she lost against American Lee Kiefer.

Guo represented Canada at the 2020 Summer Olympics in Tokyo, Japan. She competed in the women's foil and women's team foil events. She advanced to the Table of 16 in individual foil, and helped Canada to a fifth-place finish in team foil.

In 2021, Guo won the Cadet Women's Foil World Championship in Cairo, Egypt.

On 6 April 2022, Guo successfully defended her Cadet Women's Foil World Championship title in Dubai. In the final match of women’s foil, Guo faced Great Britain’s Carolina Stutchbury, winning with a 15-7 score. In the semifinal round, Stutchbury won against Japan’s Rino Nagase, 15-10, while Guo defeated Italy’s Matilde Molinari, 15-11.

References

External links 
 

Living people
2005 births
Sportspeople from Toronto
Canadian female foil fencers
Pan American Games silver medalists for Canada
Pan American Games medalists in fencing
Medalists at the 2019 Pan American Games
Fencers at the 2019 Pan American Games
Fencers at the 2020 Summer Olympics
Olympic fencers of Canada
World Cadets and Juniors Fencing Championships medalists
21st-century Canadian women